The swimming competition at the 1983 Mediterranean Games was held in Casablanca, Morocco.

Medallists

Men's events

Women's events

Medal table

References
Complete 1983 Mediterranean Games report released by the International Mediterranean Games Committee

Mediterranean Games
Sports at the 1983 Mediterranean Games
1983